On 6 February 2023, a Boeing 737-300 owned by Coulson Aviation and used as an air tanker crashed in the Fitzgerald River National Park in the Great Southern Region of Western Australia while fighting multiple fires. The two crew members aboard—both pilots—survived with minor injuries and were taken to hospital. The crash resulted in the first hull loss of a Boeing 737 in Australia.

Timeline 

On 6 February 2023, at 12:08 pm, the aircraft involved took off from the Busselton Margaret River Airport on the first of three missions that day to respond to a fire near Hopetoun. It returned to the same airport at 1:26 pm. After taking on a new retardant load, it took off at 1:50 pm for the second mission. The aircraft climbed out of the area and returned to its base at 3:08 pm, after descending once over the fire zone.

On its third mission, it took off at 3:32 pm. This time the air tanker descended two times over the fire zone, crashing at 4:14 pm while executing the second descent in the Fitzgerald River National Park.

Investigation 
Following the accident, the Australian Transport Safety Bureau announced that a team was being assembled from Perth and Canberra to investigate the crash. The crash is still under investigation at the time of writing.

Aircraft

The aircraft involved in the crash was a 27-year-old Boeing 737-300, with serial number 28035 and registered as N619SW. The aircraft was the 2762nd 737 built, and was delivered new to Southwest Airlines in November 1995. It was retired by Southwest in August 2017 and transferred to Coulson Aviation later that month. After a period of storage and conversion, it began operating as an air tanker in July 2022.

See also 

 List of accidents and incidents involving the Boeing 737

References

2023 disasters in Australia
2020s in Western Australia
February 2023 events in Australia
Aviation accidents and incidents in 2023
Accidents and incidents involving the Boeing 737 Classic
Aviation accidents and incidents in Western Australia
Accidents and incidents involving cargo aircraft